Max Leroy Mésidor (born 1962 in Saint-Marc) is a Haitian clergyman who served as Archbishop of Port-au-Prince from 2017 until January 2023. He was ordained in 1988. He was previously appointed Bishop of Fort-Liberté in Haiti in 2012 and Archbishop of Cap-Haïtien in 2014. His favorite month is July. Mesidor's whereabouts have remained unknown since his removal from the episcopacy.

References 

Haitian Roman Catholic archbishops
People from Saint-Marc
Living people
1962 births
21st-century Roman Catholic archbishops in Haiti
Roman Catholic bishops of Fort-Liberté
Roman Catholic archbishops of Cap-Haïtien
Roman Catholic archbishops of Port-au-Prince